Michel Pezet (born 1942) is a French politician.

Early life
Michel Pezet was born on April 2, 1942 in Marseille, France.

Career
Pezet is a lawyer and a member of the Socialist Party. He served as a member of the National Assembly from 1988 to 1993.

References

1942 births
Living people
Politicians from Marseille
French Section of the Workers' International politicians
Socialist Party (France) politicians
Deputies of the 8th National Assembly of the French Fifth Republic
Deputies of the 9th National Assembly of the French Fifth Republic